Crossroads Christian Church is an Evangelical Christian megachurch, located in Corona, California, United States.

History
Crossroads Christian Church was founded in 1892 by nine members in Corona, California. Led by Reverend Wright and Sister Iola, the church opened as the "First Christian Church of South Riverside." In 1932, the church changed its name to "1st Christian Church, Corona"; at the time, it had 100 members. The current name was put in place in 1980.

As of 2009, Crossroads Christian Church has over 8,000 members and is led by senior pastor Chuck Booher. Crossroads Christian Church has been highlighted by some Christian media organizations for having the most recorded baptisms in one year and the largest Easter Service attendance.

General
Crossroads Christian Church is situated on a  campus.

In 2005, a 3,000-seat worship center and chapel were opened. To celebrate the opening of the worship center several concerts were presented featuring artists such as Olivia Newton-John, SHeDAISY, Delirious?, Jeremy Camp, Michael W. Smith, Lonestar, Casting Crowns, Phil Vassar and Third.

The church has a variety of ministries available to attendees including online audio and video sermons and a separate Spanish language ministry.

Restoration Roasters
In 2003, Crossroads opened its first full-service café called Third Place Cafe. Day. Third Place Cafe was retired in 2013, and the space has been converted into a coffee shop named "Restoration Roasters." It is run by the Orange County Rescue Mission.

Beliefs and Practices
Crossroads Christian Church bases its teachings on this belief that the entirety of the Bible is directly inspired by God. The church also holds in account the belief in the Trinity, as well as the recognition of the death of Christ on the cross and resurrection.

From the commands found in the Bible, the church practices the following:
 Salvation. Each service offers an Altar call, a time and space for people to make a spiritual commitment to Jesus Christ publicly.
 Water baptism. Baptism by immersion symbolizes a person's faith and obedience, as well as their union with Christ. Baptism is available to church attendees at every service.
 Communion. The church believes the Bible asks for this act of remembrance and faith. Communion is offered during every service.

References

External links

 

Evangelical megachurches in the United States
Megachurches in California
Religious organizations established in 1892
19th-century Protestant churches
Evangelical churches in California
Churches in Riverside County, California
Buildings and structures in Corona, California
Culture of Corona, California